Mauro Huerta Díaz (born 23 August 1967) is a Mexican politician from the Ecologist Green Party of Mexico. From 2000 to 2003 he served as Deputy of the LVIII Legislature of the Mexican Congress representing the Federal District.

References

1967 births
Living people
Politicians from Mexico City
National Action Party (Mexico) politicians
Ecologist Green Party of Mexico politicians
21st-century Mexican politicians
Deputies of the LVIII Legislature of Mexico
Members of the Chamber of Deputies (Mexico) for Mexico City